Wallingford-Swarthmore School District is a midsized, suburban public school district in south-eastern Delaware County, Pennsylvania in the United States. It serves the boroughs of Swarthmore, Rose Valley and Rutledge, and the township of Nether Providence (consisting largely of the unincorporated community of Wallingford). encompasses approximately 7 square miles. According to 2000 federal census data, it serves a resident population of 21,430. In 2009, the district residents' per capita income was $35,604, while the median family income was $86,442. In the Commonwealth, the median family income was $49,501 and the United States median family income was $49,445, in 2010. According to Wallingford-Swarthmore School District officials, in the school year 2007–08, the Wallingford-Swarthmore School District provided basic educational services to 3,539 pupils. It  employed 317 teachers, 208 full-time and part-time support personnel, and 22 administrators. Wallingford-Swarthmore School District received more than $8.2 million in state funding, in school year 2007–08.

The school district has one high school, one middle school, and three elementary schools. Wallingford-Swarthmore schools are highly regarded, and the district is one of the best in suburban Philadelphia. Strath Haven High School has won two Blue Ribbons of Excellence, and in 2004 Wallingford Elementary School received one from the state and one from the National government.

High school

Strath Haven High School
Main article: Strath Haven High School

Strath Haven High School is located at 205 South Providence Road, Wallingford. The school currently has 1,140 students in grades 9-12, with 11.1% of students eligible for a free or discounted lunch.

Middle school

Strath Haven Middle School
Strath Haven Middle School is located at 200 South Providence Road, Wallingford. The school currently has 885 students in grades 6-8, with 13.9% of students eligible for a free or discounted lunch.

Starting in October 2007, SHMS underwent a series of renovations and additions. Phase 1 included the addition of a new classroom building, and Phase 2 included renovation of one of the existing buildings and demolition of the other two existing buildings. Phase 1 opened in April 2009, and Phase 2 opened in May 2010. The other two existing buildings were demolished in time for the 2010-11 school year.

Elementary schools

Swarthmore-Rutledge Elementary School
Swarthmore-Rutledge Elementary School is located at 100 College Avenue, Swarthmore. Housed in the old Swarthmore High School, the school currently serves 586 students in grades K-5, with 6.8% of students eligible for a free or discounted lunch.

Wallingford Elementary School
Wallingford Elementary School is located at 20 South Providence Road, Wallingford. The school serves 460 students in grades K-5, with 10.7% of students eligible for a free or discounted lunch.

Starting in June 2011, WES would undergo a series of renovations and expansions, including a new classroom building, gymnasium and library, and renovated offices. The new WES opened in September 2012, in time for the 2012-13 school year.

Nether Providence Elementary School
Nether Providence Elementary School is located at 410 Moore Road, Wallingford. The school serves 517 students in grades K-5, with roughly 20% of students eligible for a free or discounted lunch.

Starting in spring 2013, NPE underwent a series of renovations and an addition housing a new gym, offices and music suite. Two of the existing buildings would be renovated and one would be demolished. The phased renovation/expansion project opened in January 2015.

References

External links 
 Wallingford-Swarthmore School District

School districts in Delaware County, Pennsylvania